Dupineta is a genus of flowering plants belonging to the family Melastomataceae.

Its native range is tropical Africa, and found in the countries of Angola, Cameroon, Central African Repu, Congo, Ethiopia, Gabon, Gambia, Guinea, Gulf of Guinea Is., Ivory Coast, Kenya, Liberia, Nigeria, Rwanda, Sierra Leone, Sudan, Tanzania, Togo, Zambia and Zaïre.

The genus name of Dupineta is in honour of Antoine du Pinet (1515–1584), French writer from Lyon, and was first published in Sylva Tellur on page  101 in 1838.

Known species:
Dupineta brazzae 
Dupineta hensii 
Dupineta loandensis 
Dupineta multiflora 
Dupineta pauwelsii

References

Melastomataceae
Melastomataceae genera
Plants described in 1838
Flora of Africa